文 (pinyin wén) is Kangxi radical (no. 67).  The Chinese character 文 wén means "literature" or "culture", and may also be a Chinese surname.

文 may refer to:

the Chinese for "literature", see Chinese literature
the Chinese for "culture", see Chinese culture
the Chinese for "writing", see Chinese writing
the Chinese for "civil", see Wen and wu

As a proper name, it may also refer to:

In currencies:
 Chinese cash (currency unit), "wén", the currency of China prior to the yuan
 Japanese mon (currency), a currency used in Japan until 1870
 Korean mun, the main currency of Korea from 1633 until 1892
 Ryukyuan mon, the currency of the Ryukyu islands from 1454 until 1879
 Vietnamese cash or văn, the currency of Vietnam from 968 until 1945

In people:
King Mun of Balhae (文王) (r. 737–793), ruler of an ancient Korean kingdom
Emperor Wen of Han China (漢文帝) (202 BC–157 BC), Han Dynasty Chinese ruler
Emperor Wen of Liu Song (宋文帝) (407–453), Liu Song Dynasty Chinese ruler
Fumi Hirano (平野文) (b. 1955), Japanese voice actress and essayist
King Wen of Zhou (周文王) (1099–1050 BC), Zhou Dynasty Chinese ruler
Wen Tianxiang (文天祥) (1236–1283 AD), Song Dynasty prime minister, scholar-general
Wen Zhengming (文徵明) (1470–1559), Ming Dynasty painter, calligrapher, and scholar
Wen Zhenheng (文震亨) (1585–1645 AD), Ming Dynasty painter, scholar

See also 
Wen County (disambiguation)
Wen Jiabao, Premier of the People's Republic of China, with the similar-sounding surname 温 (wēn)

fr:文 (sinogramme)
fr:WEN